Tung Tau Tsuen, formerly Tung Tau Lei, is a village in Ha Tsuen, Yuen Long District, Hong Kong.

Administration
Tung Tau Tsuen is a recognized village under the New Territories Small House Policy.

History
During the Hungwu reign of the Ming Dynasty, two members of Tang clans in Kam Tin left for Ha Tsuen as they saw the potentials of this place as markets and places of producing fish and salt.
These two members of Tang clans, Tang Hung Wai and Tang Hung Chih, built two villages there. The two villages are Tseung Kong Wai (formerly Sai Tau Lei) and Tung Tau Tsuen (formerly Tung Tau Lei).

References

External links

 Delineation of area of existing village Tung Tau Tsuen (Ha Tsuen) for election of resident representative (2019 to 2022)

Villages in Yuen Long District, Hong Kong
Ha Tsuen